The Taipei Economic and Cultural Office in Argentina; (Spanish: Oficina Comercial y Cultural de Taipei en Argentina) represents the interests of Taiwan in Argentina in the absence of formal diplomatic relations, functioning as a de facto embassy. 

The Office is headed by a Representative, Lien Sheng Huang. 

It also has responsibility for relations with Uruguay. These were previously handled by the now closed Oficina Economica de Taipei in Montevideo. 

Its counterpart in Taiwan is the Argentina Trade and Cultural Office in Taipei.

History
Diplomatic relations between Argentina and the Republic of China (ROC) started in 1945. However, Argentina switched diplomatic relations from ROC to the People's Republic of China on 19 February 1972. In the same year, ROC closed its embassy in Buenos Aires and established the Oficina Comercial de Taiwán or "Taiwan Trade Office" in 1973, adopting its present name in August 1995.

Organizational structures
 Consular Affairs Division
 Economic Division
 Press and Culture Division
 Overseas Compatriots Division

Representatives
 Antonio Hsieh
 Miguel Tsao (25 June 2021 –)

See also
 List of diplomatic missions of Taiwan
 List of diplomatic missions in Argentina

References

External links
 Oficina Económica y Cultural de Taipei en Argentina

 

1973 establishments in Argentina
Argentina–Taiwan relations
Taiwan
Organizations established in 1973
Diplomatic missions in Buenos Aires
Argentina